Look-Out Sister is a 1949 film featuring Louis Jordan. Directed by Bud Pollard, it is a satirical, Western-themed musical and "horse opera". The film was produced by Astor Pictures. John E. Gordon wrote the story. The film remains in existence and is available online.

Jordan performs numerous songs in the film. The plot features Louis Jordan as a burnt out musician who heads to a sanitorium to recover and the dreams of going out west to a dude ranch. A poster for the film advertises it as including 11 great song hits and features the tagline "when he's not singin' he's shootin, when he's not shootin" he's lovin'. Louise Franklin plays a featured role in the film.

The film was directed by Bud Pollard and Louis Jordan.

Excerpts from this film and his others, Beware (1946) and Reet, Petite and Gone (1947), as well as soundies were released as Louis Jordan: films and soundies

The Jazz Society of Chicago and Chicago Film Society scheduled a showing of the film in 2019 calling it a "joyously ingratiating, loose-limbed musical that packs 11 songs into an hour.

Production
The film, called Lookout'' while in production, was budgeted at $60,000. It was named after Jordan's original song, "Look Out". Louis Jordan was one of the investors for the film. Some of the "swim and western atmosphere shots" were taken in the San Fernando Valley. During filming, Maceo Sheffield was injured after falling off of a horse in a scene where he was "in pursuit of an outlaw band".

Cast
Louis Jordan
Suzette Harbin
Monte Hawley
Louise Franklin
Glenn Allen
Tommy Southern

References

1947 Western (genre) films
1947 musical films
Astor Pictures films